CSA - Credit Solutions of America, Inc. was a debt settlement company based in Dallas, Texas.  It had more than 1,200 employees and had served more than 250,000 customers. It was established in 2003.

Background
Debt settlement companies negotiate with creditors to accept reduced payments on unsecured debt, like credit cards and medical debt.  CSA settled more than $1.1 billion of debt from 2003 to 2012, with an average settlement of 45 cents on the dollar. 

In 2007, the company was recognized by JD Powers and Associates, for excellence in satisfying its customers.  CSA had also been certified as ISO 9000:2008 from BSI, which was a result of ongoing company wide audits by an independent third party to ensure quality management systems.

The company had a community service group called "CSA Cares," through which employees volunteered over 20,000 hours with Dallas/Fort Worth area nonprofit organizations.

References

Financial services companies of the United States
American companies established in 2003
Financial services companies established in 2003
Companies based in Dallas
2003 establishments in Texas
2003 establishments in the United States